Abigail Holden (born 29 August 1999) is an English badminton player who competes in international events. She took the English National crown in the women's singles event at the 2021 English National Badminton Championships. She competes for her club Surrey Smashers. She is currently ranked world number 152 in women's singles and world number 183 in women's doubles

Achievements

BWF International Challenge/Series (4 titles, 2 runners-up) 
Women's singles

Women's doubles

  BWF International Challenge tournament
  BWF International Series tournament
  BWF Future Series tournament

References 

1999 births
Living people
People from Wokingham
English female badminton players